Perumpanachy is a village in Kottayam district of Kerala state in India. Perumpanachy falls under Madapally Panchayat and Chanaganacherry Thaluk. The village is situated 6 km away from Changanassery.  The greenish landscape includes rubber plantation, paddy fields, coconut trees, pepper and a wide variety of plants and trees.

Religious centers 
 St Antony's Syro-Malabar Forane Church, Kurumpanadam a Catholic church built in the 18th century about one half kilometer away from Perumpanachy.
 Madapally Bhagavathi (Goddess) Temple
 There is a mosque nearby to Perumpanachy (at Thengana).

Banks 
Madapally Service Co-operative Bank Ltd. No. 160: established in 1920, head office and main branch
Kottayam District Co-operative Bank Ltd., Perumpanachy Branch

Fertilizer Depots 
Madapally Service Co-operative Bank fertilizer depot: all organic and chemical fertilizers available

Schools 
St.Peter's Higher Secondary School, Kurumpanadom
Govt. L P School, Perumpanachy
C S U P School, Madappally
St. Antonys L P School, Kurumpanadom
St. Joseph English Medium School, Kurumpanadom

References 

Villages in Kottayam district